Kanasubigi, possibly read as Kanas Ubigi or Kanas U Bigi was a title of the early Bulgar rulers of First Bulgarian Empire. Omurtag and his son Malamir are mentioned in inscriptions as Kanasubigi.

The title khan for early Bulgarian rulers is an assumed one, as only the form kanasubigi or "kanasybigi" is attested in stone inscriptions. Among the proposed translations for the phrase kanasubigi as a whole are lord of the army, from the reconstructed Turkic phrase *sü begi, paralleling the attested Old Turkic sü baši, and, more recently, "(ruler) from God", from the Indo-European *su- and  baga-, i.e. *su-baga (an equivalent of the Greek phrase , ho ek Theou archon, which is common in Bulgar inscriptions). Another presumption is that the title means the great khan. This titulature presumably persisted until the Bulgars adopted Christianity. Some Bulgar inscriptions written in Greek and later in Slavonic refer to the Bulgarian ruler respectively with the Greek title archon or the Slavic title knyaz.

References

Bibliography
Hanswilhelm Haefs, Das goldene Reich der Pamir-Bulgaren an Donau und Wardar (p. 120), 

Bulgar language
Bulgarian royalty
Bulgarian noble titles
First Bulgarian Empire